Ptericoptus columbianus is a species of beetle in the family Cerambycidae. It was described by Breuning in 1950. It is known from Colombia.

References

Ptericoptus
Beetles described in 1950